The 1994 New York Yankees season was the 92nd season for the Yankees. New York was managed by Buck Showalter and played at Yankee Stadium. The season was cut short by the 1994 player's strike, which wiped out any postseason aspirations for their first postseason appearance since losing the 1981 World Series and that their star player and captain, Don Mattingly, had. On the day the strike began, the team had a record of 70-43,  games ahead of the Baltimore Orioles, the best record in the American League and the second-best record in Major League Baseball. The Yankees were on pace to win at least 100 games for the first time since 1980. The Yankees' ace, 33-year-old veteran Jimmy Key, was leading the majors with 17 wins and was on pace to win 24 games. Right fielder Paul O'Neill was also having a career year, as he was leading the league with a .359 batting average.

The strike is remembered bitterly by Yankees fans as it shook sports fans in New York City and the Yankees to the core, and has been named among the 10 worst moments in New York City sports history, primarily because Mattingly had not played in a postseason. It was also seen as the frustrating peak of the Yankees' downfall of the 1980s and early 1990s.

Many fans said that the strike and the lost Yankees season was another blow to baseball backers in New York City, following the move of the Dodgers and the Giants to California for the 1958 season, the demise of the Yankees during the 1960s and early 1970s, and the bad baseball at Shea Stadium during the late 1970s and early 1990s. The strike ruined the chance for the Yankees to follow in the footsteps of the NHL Stanley Cup Champion Rangers and NBA Eastern Conference Champion Knicks by making the championship round of their respective sport.

Because the Yankees' last postseason appearance had been in a season cut short by a strike, the media often remarked on the parallels between the two Yankee teams (1981 and 1994), which included both teams having division leads taken away by strike. Throughout October, they continued to bombard the Yankees, making speculations about what might have been if there had not been a strike.

Offseason
November 27, 1993: Andy Stankiewicz and Domingo Jean were traded by the Yankees to the Houston Astros for Xavier Hernandez.
December 9, 1993: Spike Owen was traded by the Yankees with cash to the California Angels for Jose Musset (minors).
December 20, 1993: Luis Polonia was signed as a free agent by the Yankees.
December 22, 1993: Sam Horn was signed as a free agent by the Yankees.
January 28, 1994: Bob Ojeda signed as a free agent by the Yankees.
 February 9, 1994: Bobby Muñoz, Ryan Karp, and Kevin Jordan were traded by the Yankees to the Philadelphia Phillies for Terry Mulholland and a player to be named later. The Phillies completed the deal by sending Jeff Patterson to the New York Yankees on November 8.
February 15, 1994: Jeff Reardon was signed as a free agent by the Yankees.

Regular season

By Friday, August 12, the Yankees had compiled a 70-43 record through 113 games. They were leading the AL East Division and had scored 670 runs (5.93 per game) and allowed 534 runs (4.73 per game). Yankees hitters were walked 530 times in the strike-shortened season: the most in the Majors. They also led the Majors in on-base percentage, with .374. They did, however, tie the San Diego Padres for the most double plays grounded into, with 112.

The World Series, for which the Yankees appeared to be destined, was never played and contributed to Buck Showalter not having his contract renewed and Don Mattingly retiring after the 1995 season. In addition, General Manager Gene Michael was fired as a result of the strike. The 1994 New York Yankees team that could have been remains a hot discussion point in both baseball and in New York City because Mattingly had not played in a postseason. When reacting to the strike's cancellation of the season, the first words many people on the Yankees, including Owner George Steinbrenner, Michael, and Showalter all said was that they all felt bad for Mattingly, saying that he deserved a postseason. Mattingly led active players in both games played and at bats without ever appearing in the postseason.

Opening Day lineup

Game log

|-  style="text-align:center; background:#bfb;"
| 1 || April 4 || Rangers
|-  style="text-align:center; background:#bfb;"
| 2 || April 7 || Rangers
|-  style="text-align:center; background:#bfb;"
| 3 || April 8 || Tigers
|-  style="text-align:center; background:#fbb;"
| 4 || April 9 || Tigers
|-  style="text-align:center; background:#fbb;"
| 5 || April 10 || Tigers
|-  style="text-align:center; background:#fbb;"
| 6 || April 12 || @ White Sox
|-  style="text-align:center; background:#fbb;"
| 7 || April 13 || @ White Sox
|-  style="text-align:center; background:#bfb;"
| 8 || April 14 || @ White Sox
|-  style="text-align:center; background:#bfb;"
| 9 || April 15 || @ Tigers
|-  style="text-align:center; background:#fbb;"
| 10 || April 16 || @ Tigers
|-  style="text-align:center; background:#bfb;"
| 11 || April 17 || @ Tigers
|-  style="text-align:center; background:#fbb;"
| 12 || April 19 || Mariners
|-  style="text-align:center; background:#bfb;"
| 13 || April 20 || Mariners
|-  style="text-align:center; background:#bfb;"
| 14 || April 21 || Mariners
|-  style="text-align:center; background:#bfb;"
| 15 || April 22 || Athletics
|-  style="text-align:center; background:#bfb;"
| 16 || April 23 || Athletics
|-  style="text-align:center; background:#bfb;"
| 17 || April 24 || Athletics
|-  style="text-align:center; background:#bfb;"
| 18 || April 25 || Angels
|-  style="text-align:center; background:#fbb;"
| 19 || April 26 || Angels
|-  style="text-align:center; background:#bfb;"
| 20 || April 27 || @ Mariners
|-  style="text-align:center; background:#fbb;"
| 21 || April 28 || @ Mariners
|-  style="text-align:center; background:#bfb;"
| 22 || April 29 || @ Athletics
|-  style="text-align:center; background:#bfb;"
| 23 || April 30 || @ Athletics
|-

|-  style="text-align:center; background:#fbb;"
| 24 || May 1 || @ Athletics
|-  style="text-align:center; background:#bfb;"
| 25 || May 3 || @ Angels
|-  style="text-align:center; background:#fbb;"
| 26 || May 4 || @ Angels
|-  style="text-align:center; background:#bfb;"
| 27 || May 6 || Red Sox
|-  style="text-align:center; background:#bfb;"
| 28 || May 7 || Red Sox
|-  style="text-align:center; background:#bfb;"
| 29 || May 8 || Red Sox
|-  style="text-align:center; background:#bfb;"
| 30 || May 9 || Indians
|-  style="text-align:center; background:#bfb;"
| 31 || May 10 || Indians
|-  style="text-align:center; background:#bfb;"
| 32 || May 11 || Indians
|-  style="text-align:center; background:#bfb;"
| 33 || May 12 || Indians
|-  style="text-align:center; background:#bfb;"
| 34 || May 13 || @ Brewers
|-  style="text-align:center; background:#bfb;"
| 35 || May 14 || @ Brewers
|-  style="text-align:center; background:#bfb;"
| 36 || May 15 || @ Brewers
|-  style="text-align:center; background:#fbb;"
| 37 || May 17 || @ Twins
|-  style="text-align:center; background:#fbb;"
| 38 || May 18 || @ Twins
|-  style="text-align:center; background:#bfb;"
| 39 || May 20 || Orioles
|-  style="text-align:center; background:#bfb;"
| 40 || May 21 || Orioles
|-  style="text-align:center; background:#fbb;"
| 41 || May 22 || Orioles
|-  style="text-align:center; background:#bfb;"
| 42 || May 24 || Blue Jays
|-  style="text-align:center; background:#bfb;"
| 43 || May 25 || Blue Jays
|-  style="text-align:center; background:#bfb;"
| 44 || May 27 || @ Royals
|-  style="text-align:center; background:#bfb;"
| 45 || May 28 || @ Royals
|-  style="text-align:center; background:#fbb;"
| 46 || May 29 || @ Royals
|-  style="text-align:center; background:#fbb;"
| 47 || May 30 || White Sox
|-  style="text-align:center; background:#bfb;"
| 48 || May 31 || White Sox
|-

|-  style="text-align:center; background:#fbb;"
| 49 || June 1 || White Sox
|-  style="text-align:center; background:#fbb;"
| 50 || June 3 || Royals
|-  style="text-align:center; background:#fbb;"
| 51 || June 4 || Royals
|-  style="text-align:center; background:#fbb;"
| 52 || June 5 || Royals
|-  style="text-align:center; background:#bfb;"
| 53 || June 6 || @ Rangers
|-  style="text-align:center; background:#fbb;"
| 54 || June 7 || @ Rangers
|-  style="text-align:center; background:#fbb;"
| 55 || June 8 || @ Rangers
|-  style="text-align:center; background:#fbb;"
| 56 || June 9 || @ Blue Jays
|-  style="text-align:center; background:#fbb;"
| 57 || June 10 || @ Blue Jays
|-  style="text-align:center; background:#bfb;"
| 58 || June 11 || @ Blue Jays
|-  style="text-align:center; background:#fbb;"
| 59 || June 12 || @ Blue Jays
|-  style="text-align:center; background:#bfb;"
| 60 || June 13 || @ Orioles
|-  style="text-align:center; background:#bfb;"
| 61 || June 14 || @ Orioles
|-  style="text-align:center; background:#fbb;"
| 62 || June 15 || @ Orioles
|-  style="text-align:center; background:#bfb;"
| 63 || June 16 || @ Orioles
|-  style="text-align:center; background:#fbb;"
| 64 || June 17 || Brewers
|-  style="text-align:center; background:#bfb;"
| 65 || June 18 || Brewers
|-  style="text-align:center; background:#fbb;"
| 66 || June 19 || Brewers
|-  style="text-align:center; background:#bfb;"
| 67 || June 20 || Twins
|-  style="text-align:center; background:#bfb;"
| 68 || June 21 || Twins
|-  style="text-align:center; background:#bfb;"
| 69 || June 22 || Twins
|-  style="text-align:center; background:#bfb;"
| 70 || June 24 || @ Indians
|-  style="text-align:center; background:#bfb;"
| 71 || June 26 || @ Indians
|-  style="text-align:center; background:#bfb;"
| 72 || June 27 || @ Red Sox
|-  style="text-align:center; background:#bfb;"
| 73 || June 28 || @ Red Sox
|-  style="text-align:center; background:#bfb;"
| 74 || June 29 || @ Red Sox
|-  style="text-align:center; background:#fbb;"
| 75 || June 30 || @ Red Sox
|-

|-  style="text-align:center; background:#fbb;"
| 76 || July 1 || Mariners
|-  style="text-align:center; background:#fbb;"
| 77 || July 2 || Mariners
|-  style="text-align:center; background:#bfb;"
| 78 || July 3 || Mariners
|-  style="text-align:center; background:#fbb;"
| 79 || July 4 || Athletics
|-  style="text-align:center; background:#fbb;"
| 80 || July 5 || Athletics
|-  style="text-align:center; background:#fbb;" 
| 81 || July 6 || Athletics
|-  style="text-align:center; background:#bfb;"
| 82 || July 7 || Angels
|-  style="text-align:center; background:#bfb;"
| 83 || July 8 || Angels
|-  style="text-align:center; background:#fbb;"
| 84 || July 9 || Angels
|-  style="text-align:center; background:#fbb;"
| 85 || July 10 || Angels
|-  style="text-align:center; background:#bbcaff;"
|align="center" colspan="10"|All-Star Break: NL def. AL at Three Rivers Stadium, 8–7 (10)
|-  style="text-align:center; background:#bfb;"
| 86 || July 14 || @ Mariners
|-  style="text-align:center; background:#bfb;"
| 87 || July 15 || @ Mariners
|-  style="text-align:center; background:#bfb;"
| 88 || July 16 || @ Mariners
|-  style="text-align:center; background:#bfb;"
| 89 || July 17 || @ Mariners
|-  style="text-align:center; background:#bfb;"
| 90 || July 18 || @ Athletics
|-  style="text-align:center; background:#fbb;"
| 91 || July 19 || @ Athletics
|-  style="text-align:center; background:#bfb;"
| 92 || July 20 || @ Athletics
|-  style="text-align:center; background:#bfb;"
| 93 || July 21 || @ Angels
|-  style="text-align:center; background:#bfb;"
| 94 || July 22 || @ Angels
|-  style="text-align:center; background:#bfb;"
| 95 || July 23 || @ Angels
|-  style="text-align:center; background:#bfb;"
| 96 || July 24 || @ Angels
|-  style="text-align:center; background:#fbb;"
| 97 || July 26 || Red Sox
|-  style="text-align:center; background:#bfb;"
| 98 || July 27 || Red Sox
|-  style="text-align:center; background:#fbb;"
| 99 || July 28 || Red Sox
|-  style="text-align:center; background:#bfb;"
| 100 || July 29 || Indians
|-  style="text-align:center; background:#bfb;"
| 101 || July 30 || Indians
|-  style="text-align:center; background:#bfb;"
| 102 || July 31 || Indians
|-

|-  style="text-align:center; background:#bfb;"
| 103 || August 1 || @ Brewers
|-  style="text-align:center; background:#bfb;"
| 104 || August 2 || @ Brewers
|-  style="text-align:center; background:#bfb;"
| 105 || August 3 || @ Brewers
|-  style="text-align:center; background:#bfb;"
| 106 || August 4 || @ Twins
|-  style="text-align:center; background:#bfb;"
| 107 || August 5 || @ Twins
|-  style="text-align:center; background:#fbb;"
| 108 || August 6 || @ Twins
|-  style="text-align:center; background:#fbb;"
| 109 || August 7 || @ Twins
|-  style="text-align:center; background:#bfb;"
| 110 || August 8 || Orioles
|-  style="text-align:center; background:#fbb;"
| 111 || August 9 || Orioles
|-  style="text-align:center; background:#fbb;"
| 112 || August 10 || Orioles
|-  style="text-align:center; background:#fbb;"
| 113 || August 11 || Blue Jays
|-

Season standings

Record vs. opponents

Notable transactions
March 21, 1994: Paul Assenmacher was traded by the Yankees to the Chicago White Sox for Brian Boehringer.
March 29, 1994: Kevin Maas was released by the Yankees.
May 1, 1994: Kevin Elster was signed as a free agent with the New York Yankees.
May 5, 1994: Bob Ojeda was released by the New York Yankees.
May 6, 1994: Jeff Reardon was released by the New York Yankees.
June 23, 1994: Sam Horn was released by the New York Yankees.
July 3, 1994: Greg A. Harris was signed as a free agent with the New York Yankees.
July 13, 1994: Greg A. Harris was released by the New York Yankees.

Roster

Player stats

Batting

Starters by position 
Note: Pos = Position; G = Games played; AB = At bats; H = Hits; Avg. = Batting average; HR = Home runs; RBI = Runs batted in

Other batters
Note: G = Games played; AB = At bats; R = Runs; H = Hits; Avg. = Batting average; HR = Home runs; RBI = Runs batted in

Pitching

Starting pitchers 
Note: G = Games pitched; IP = Innings pitched; W = Wins; L = Losses; ERA = Earned run average; SO = Strikeouts

Other pitchers
Note: G = Games pitched; IP = Innings pitched; W = Wins; L = Losses; ERA = Earned run average; SO = Strikeouts

Relief pitchers
Note: G = Games pitched; W = Wins; L = Losses; SV = Saves; ERA = Earned run average; SO = Strikeouts

Awards and honors
 Paul O'Neill – American League Batting Champion (.359)

All-Star Game
 Paul O'Neill, reserve

Farm system

LEAGUE CHAMPIONS: Tampa

References

Inline citations

Bibliography

External links
1994 New York Yankees at Baseball Reference
1994 New York Yankees team page at www.baseball-almanac.com

New York Yankees seasons
New York Yankees
New York Yankees
1990s in the Bronx